São Lourenço do Sul is a Brazilian municipality in the state of Rio Grande do Sul.  The municipality had 43,111 inhabitants in the last Census (2010). Its population in 2020 was estimated in 43,540 inhabitants. It is located at the west bank of the big lagoon Lagoa dos Patos.

The municipality contains part of the  Camaquã State Park, created in 1975.

External links

Government (in Portuguese)
 http://www.saolourencodosul.rs.gov.br/

Coordinates

References

Municipalities in Rio Grande do Sul